Southern hospitality is a phrase used in American English to describe cultural stereotype of the Southern United States, with residents perceived to show kindness, warmth, and welcoming of visitors to their homes, or to the South in general.

Origins
Although Southerners from all walks of life have been perceived as friendly for centuries, some like the writer Anthony Szczesiul claim that Southern hospitality "first existed as a narrowly defined body of social practices among the antebellum planters classes". As such, the origin of the practice was intimately tied to slavery.  One analysis notes:

Over time however, the concept "developed into a discourse that stretches far beyond the image of the planter class", and the principles of Southern hospitality were eventually adopted by non-planter class and Southern African Americans as well, and incorporated into materials used to advertise destinations in the South to other African American tourists. The concept of Southern hospitality has also been examined as a reflection of the religious beliefs of the region; the idea that one should be good to strangers is an outgrowth of such Biblical parables as the Good Samaritan. Early travel writer Ernest Hamlin Abbott wrote in 1902, "as religious observances are in the South as naturally included in the hospitality of the home as anything else, so, conversely, hospitality in the South is an integral part of the church services".

Features
Some characteristics of Southern hospitality were described as early as 1835, when Jacob Abbott attributed the poor quality of taverns in the South to the lack of need for them, given the willingness of Southerners to provide for strangers. Abbott writes:

Abbott further describes how the best stores of the house are at the disposal of visitors. Furthermore, says Abbott:

More recently, Tara McPherson writes about the representation of "tradition and manners" as "the glue that binds the South together, distinguishing it from other regions", going on to say that:

Food figures highly in Southern hospitality, a large component of the idea being the provision of Southern cuisine to visitors. A cake or other delicacy is often brought to the door of a new neighbor as a mechanism of introduction. Many club and church functions include a meal or at least a dessert and beverage. Churches in the South frequently have large commercial style kitchens to accommodate this tradition, but many "fellowship suppers" are "covered dish": everyone attending brings a dish. However, if a newcomer arrives without a dish, he or she will be made to feel welcome and served generously. When a death or serious illness occurs, neighbors, friends, and church members generally bring food to the bereaved family for a period of time. A number of cookbooks promise recipes advancing this concept.

See also
 Iowa nice
 Minnesota nice
 Seattle Freeze

References

Culture of the Southern United States
Hospitality industry in the United States
Kindness